European route E 101 is a road part of the International E-road network. It begins in Moscow, Russia, and ends in Kyiv, Ukraine.

Route 

: Moscow - Kaluga - Bryansk - border with Ukraine

: border with Russia - Hlukhiv - Kipti
: Kipti - Kyiv

References

External links 
 UN Economic Commission for Europe: Overall Map of E-road Network (2007)

101
European routes in Ukraine
E101